Private ship is a term used in the Royal Navy to describe that status of a commissioned warship in active service that is not currently serving as the flagship of a flag officer (i.e., an admiral or commodore).  The term in no way implies any type of private ownership of the vessel, but is more akin to private soldier.

Notes

References
 Burt, R. A. (1988). British Battleships 1889–1904. Annapolis, Maryland: Naval Institute Press. .

Royal Navy